Catholic Central High School is a private Roman Catholic high school in Steubenville, Ohio, United States. It is one of two secondary schools operated under the direction of the Roman Catholic Diocese of Steubenville. Athletic teams compete as the Catholic Central Crusaders in the Ohio High School Athletic Association as a member of the Ohio Valley Athletic Conference.

History
John King Mussio, after his installation as first bishop of the Diocese of Steubenville, designated Catholic Central (at its former downtown Steubenville location) a Diocesan High School under the administration of a Board made up of pastors of Steubenville, Mingo Junction, and Toronto. In 1947, plans were made for a new Catholic Central High School in the West End of Steubenville (the present location). On January 15 of that year, nine pastors and lay chairmen from each of their parishes met with Mussio in order to formulate plans for a drive to provide funds for the building of the new school.  The campaign was launched on February 16, 1947, and was successfully concluded just twelve days later.  A tract of land, the old Becker Highway property, was purchased; contracts were let and the present building was begun early in 1949. The new school opened its doors in September 1950 and graduated 171 boys and girls in 1951. In 1963-1964, the present cafeteria and auto shop complex was added, but now the auto shop is used as a weight lifting room. In 1978-1979 a third building project provided the Gymnasium/Bandroom/locker-room complex. In 1979, the new metric track field was added to the existing sports facilities. In 2008, the Bishop Mussio Junior High, housing 7th and 8th grade students was added to the former religion wing.

Performing arts
Catholic Central is home to the Crusader Marching Band, concert band, and drama club.

Academics
Steubenville Catholic Central is a fully accredited high school, meeting all secondary school requirements of both the state of Ohio and North Central Educational Association. Catholic Central High School follows a college preparatory curriculum for their students.

Athletics
CCHS competes in the Class AA division of the Ohio Valley Athletic Conference.

Sports offered
 American football
 Baseball
 Basketball
 Bowling
 Cheerleading
 Golf
 Soccer
 Fastpitch Softball
 Swimming
 Track & Field
 Volleyball
 Wrestling

OHSAA State Championships

 Baseball - 1994
 Football - 1993
 Girls Track and Field - 2011

Poll Championships:
 1971 AP/UPI Class AA Ohio State Football Champions

Notable alumni
 Danny Abramowicz, former NFL wide receiver, New Orleans Saints 
 Chinedu Achebe, Arena Football player 
John Buccigross, ESPN anchor 
 Rich Donnelly, baseball player and coach 
 Tom Franckhauser, former cornerback in the National Football League
 Tom Perko, former linebacker in the National Football League

References

External links
  School Website

Educational institutions established in 1930
High schools in Jefferson County, Ohio
Steubenville, Ohio
Catholic secondary schools in Ohio
1930 establishments in Ohio